David Kelly Campbell (born July 23, 1944) is an American theoretical physicist and academic leader. His research has spanned high energy physics, condensed matter physics and nonlinear dynamics.  He also served as Physics Department Head at the University of Illinois at Urbana–Champaign, Dean of the College Engineering at Boston University, and Boston University Provost.

Education 
 B.A. in chemistry and physics, summa cum laude, Harvard College, 1966.
 Part III, Mathematics Tripos, distinction, University of Cambridge, 1967.
 Ph.D., theoretical physics and applied mathematics, University of Cambridge, 1970.

Professional employment 
 Fellow Center for Advanced Study, University of Illinois at Urbana–Champaign.
 Member, the Institute for Advanced Study, Princeton, New Jersey.
 J. Robert Oppenheimer Fellow, Los Alamos Scientific Laboratory, 1974-1977
 Staff Member, Los Alamos National Laboratory, 1977-1992
 Director, Center for Nonlinear Studies, Los Alamos National Laboratory.
 Professor and Head, Department of Physics, University of Illinois at Urbana–Champaign, 1992-2000
 Dean College of Engineering,  Boston University, 2000-2005
 University Provost, Boston University, 2005-2011

Awards and honors 
 Sophia Freund Prize (highest ranking graduate), Harvard College, 1966.
 Marshall Scholarship, University of Cambridge, 1966-68.
 National Academy of Sciences Exchange Scientist to Soviet Union, 1977.
 Visiting Professor, University of Dijon, Dijon, France, 1984 and 1985.
 Ministry of Education Exchange Scientist to People's Republic of China, 1986.
 New Mexico Eminent Scholar, 1989.
 Emil Warburg Lecturer, University of Bayreuth, Germany, 1990.
 Toshiba Lecturer, Keio University, Tokyo, Japan, 1994.
 Deutschebank Distinguished Lecturer, Frankfurt, Germany, 1994.
 C. N. Yang Visiting Professor, Chinese University of Hong Kong, 1996.
 Stanislaw M. Ulam Scholar, Center for Nonlinear Studies, Los Alamos National Laboratory, August 1998-August 1999.
 Julius Edgar Lilienfeld Prize, American Physical Society, 2010 (jointly with Shlomo Havlin)
 Visiting Scholar, International Institute of Physics, Federal University of Rio Grande do Norte, Natal, Brazil, 2014-2016
 Gauss Professor, Akademie der Wissenschaft zur Göttingen, 2014-2015
 Fellow of the American Physical Society for significant contributions in theoretical physics to quantum field theory, condensed-matter physics, computational physics, and non-linear science, and for his leadership role in the development of institutional programs in nonlinear science both at Los Alamos and internationally.

References 

1944 births
Living people
Fellows of the American Physical Society
Boston University faculty
21st-century American physicists
University of Illinois Urbana-Champaign faculty
Alumni of the University of Cambridge
Harvard College alumni